Paschaline Alex Okoli  is a Nigerian actress who played Cordelia in the sitcom Jenifa's Diary.

Personal life 
Paschaline is a native of Anambra State, a South-Eastern region in Nigeria. She completed her basic and high school education in Anambra state. She went further to study French for her Bachelor's Degree at Imo State University, Nigeria.

Career
She started her professional acting career in 2010 with the movie titled Definition Of Love. She had her breakthrough in the sitcom titled Jenifa's Diary where she played the role of Cordelia, alongside Nollywood actress  Funke Akindele. She was also featured in the movie title Omo ghetto.

Filmography 

 College Girls
 Bleeding Trees
 Educated Housemaids
 Secondary School Girls
 No More Campus
 Agege Bread Sellers
 Ugomma goes to school
 No More Widows

Awards and nominations
Paschaline was nominated for City People Movie Award for Best New Actress of the Year (English).

References

External links
 Paschaline Alex Okoli Instagram Page  

Living people
Nigerian television actresses
21st-century Nigerian actresses
Year of birth missing (living people)
Igbo actresses
Imo State University alumni
Nigerian film actresses
Actresses from Anambra State